Main Road is a major arterial road that runs through the northern suburbs of Hobart, Tasmania. The road continues on from New Town Road at Lenah Valley and runs in close proximity with the Southern Railway Line and travels on a near parallel trajectory with the Derwent River until it reaches Granton where it merges with the Brooker Highway. Prior to the construction of the Brooker Highway the only way traffic could travel to the northern cities of the state was to drive via Main Road.

Main Road is an important road corridor that has been the major road link in Glenorchy since the 19th century. It connects the Moonah, Derwent Park and Glenorchy commercial areas. It also provides a major alternative route to Hobart than the Brooker Highway. The Main Road is used by 24,000 vehicles per day.

See also

References

Streets in Hobart
Glenorchy, Tasmania